Walter George Hassall Lowe (born 26 August 1870 in Bretby; details of death unknown) was an English first-class cricketer active 1895 who played for Nottinghamshire.

References

1870 births
Date of death unknown
English cricketers
Nottinghamshire cricketers